Aguas Blancas (Spanish: "white waters") may refer to:

 Aguas Blancas, Salta, a town on Argentina's border with Bolivia, in Salta province
 Aguas Blancas, Yauco, Puerto Rico, a barrio
 Aguas Blancas (Lavalleja), a village near Lavalleja, Uruguay

 Aguas Blancas Dam, a dam near the village
 Aguas Blancas, Guerrero, in the southern Mexican state of Guerrero
 Aguas Blancas massacre, which took place there in June 1995

Similar names
 Agua Blanca (disambiguation)